The 2016 FIBA U20 European Championship was the 19th edition of the FIBA U20 European Championship. The competition took place in Helsinki, Finland, from 16 to 24 July 2016.

Participating teams
 
 
  (Winners, 2015 FIBA Europe Under-20 Championship Division B)

  (3rd place, 2015 FIBA Europe Under-20 Championship Division B)
 

  (Runners-up, 2015 FIBA Europe Under-20 Championship Division B)

First round
In this round, the 16 teams are allocated in four groups of four teams each. All teams will advance to the Second Round of 16.

Group A

Group B

Group C

Group D

Final round

Round of 16

9th–16th place classification

9th–16th place quarterfinals

13th–16th place semifinals

15th place game

13th place game

9th–12th place semifinals

Eleventh place game

Ninth place game

Quarterfinals

5th–8th place classification

5th–8th place semifinals

Seventh place game

Fifth place game

Semifinals

Third place game

Final

Final standings

Awards

All-Tournament Team
  Francis Alonso
  Marc García 
  Kristupas Zemaitis 
  Lauri Markkanen
  Ömer Yurtseven

References

External links
FIBA official website

2016–17 in European basketball
2016–17 in Finnish basketball
International youth basketball competitions hosted by Finland
FIBA U20 European Championship
International sports competitions in Helsinki
July 2016 sports events in Europe
2010s in Helsinki